Gamer is a 2009 American science fiction action film written and directed by Mark Neveldine and Brian Taylor. The film stars Gerard Butler as a participant in an online game in which participants can control human beings as players, and Logan Lerman as the player who controls him. Alongside Butler and Lerman, it also stars Michael C. Hall, Ludacris, Amber Valletta, Terry Crews, Alison Lohman, John Leguizamo, Sam Witwer and Zoë Bell.

Gamer was released in North America on September 4, 2009, receiving generally negative reviews from critics and grossed $43 million worldwide against a production budget of $50 million.

Plot
In 2034, computer programmer Ken Castle (Michael C. Hall) invents self-replicating nanites that replace brain tissue and allow humans to control other humans' actions and see through their eyes.  The first application of Castle's "Nanex" technology is a virtual community life simulation game, Society, which allows gamers to manipulate live actors as their avatars.  Society becomes a worldwide sensation, making Castle the richest man in the world. He then creates Slayers, a first-person shooter where the "characters" are death-row prisoners using real weapons in specially created arenas.  Unlike Society actors, Slayers participants are not paid; instead, they volunteer in exchange for the promise that any Slayer who survives 30 matches will earn his freedom.

John "Kable" Tillman (Gerard Butler) is the crowd's favorite, having survived a record 27 matches since no inmate before him has managed to last more than ten. He is exclusively controlled by Simon (Logan Lerman), a seventeen-year-old superstar gamer from a wealthy family.

An activist organization called the "Humanz" hacks a talk-show interview with Castle and claims that his technology will one day be used to control people against their will. The Humanz also disrupts Society play, but Castle sees both these actions as trivial.  However, Castle feels threatened by Kable's winning streak, and introduces a new inmate into Slayers, Hackman (Terry Crews), specifically to kill Kable.  Unknown to anyone else, Hackman will not be controlled by a player, and thus not be handicapped by the "ping" that causes a small but dangerous delay between the player's command and the Slayer's action.

Kable/Tillman's estranged wife, Angie (Amber Valletta), works as a Society character, but in spite of her earnings, she is refused custody of their daughter Delia, who has been placed with a wealthy foster family.

The Humanz contact Kable and Simon separately, and offer to create a mod that will let him escape, but only if Simon relinquishes control during the game.  The escape is successful, and news outlets report that Kable has been fragged, which puts Simon in a difficult position: he is labeled a "cheater", locked out of his bank account, and arrested by the FBI for helping Kable escape.

Kable is brought to the Humanz' hideout; he refuses to help their fight against Castle, but learns of Angie's current location in Society.  He rescues her, escaping from both Hackman and Castle's security forces. They are met by Gina (Kyra Sedgwick), the talk show host, secretly assisting the Humanz.  The Humanz deactivates the nanites in Angie and Kable's brains, and Kable remembers that the original nanites were tested on him while he was still in the military.  Under Castle's control, Kable shot and killed his best friend, and was imprisoned.

Upon learning that Castle is the wealthy father who adopted Delia, Kable infiltrates his mansion to get her back. He locates Castle, who reveals that his henchmen have already tracked down the Humanz' lair and killed all of them.  He also reveals that 98% of his own brain has been replaced with nanites, but this allows him to control others, rather than be controlled.  He plans to release air-borne nanites which will infect the entire United States within six months, giving him ultimate control. Hackman attacks Kable, who easily kills him.  Kable then attacks Castle but is frozen in place, as Castle explains that his men have reactivated his and Angie's nanites.

Unknown to Castle, Gina and Trace (Alison Lohman) escaped the murder, and patch into the Nanex, revealing the confrontation to the world and exposing Castle's plans worldwide. They also restore Simon's account, allowing him to regain control of Kable.

Castle tries to manipulate Kable into killing his own daughter, but he resists, and then Simon's control allows him to attack Castle.  He and Simon wrestle for control over Kable, but Kable tells Castle to imagine his knife stabbing him. Castle unconsciously does so, allowing Kable to kill him and removing his control over everyone.  With Castle dead, Kable convinces his technicians to deactivate the Nanex, freeing all the "characters" in Society and Slayers.

Cast
 Gerard Butler as John "Kable" Tillman, the highest-ranked warrior in the game Slayers. 
 Amber Valletta as Angie "Nika" Roth Tillman, Kable's wife, an avatar in Society. 
 Michael C. Hall as Ken Castle, the wealthy manipulative, ruthless and famous creator of Society and Slayers, and a top genius professional computer programmer. 
 Kyra Sedgwick as Gina Parker Smith, a famous talk show host who meets the Humanz and investigates them.
 Logan Lerman as Simon Silverton, the 17-year-old gamer "playing" Kable.
 Ariana Scott as Shelley Silverton aka SISSYPUSS, the sister of Simon
 Terry Crews as Hackman, a psychopathic inmate sent to murder Kable.
 Alison Lohman as Trace, a member of the Humanz.
 Ludacris as Brother, the spokesperson and leader of the Humanz.
 Aaron Yoo as Dude, a member of the Humanz and a hacker.
 John Leguizamo as Freek, an inmate who befriends Kable. 
 Zoë Bell as Sandra, an inmate.
 Mimi Michaels as Stikkimuffin, another teenage gamer. A fan of Simon.
 Ashley Rickards as 2KATCHAPREDATOR (a girl dating an inmate)
 Jade Ramsey and Nikita Ramsey as the KUMDUMPSTAZ (British twins)
 Milo Ventimiglia as Rick Rape
 Jonathan Chase as Geek Leader, the head of Castle's technical team.
 Keith David as Agent Keith, a CIA agent.

Joseph D. Reitman and John de Lancie appear as senior members of Castle’s company. Lloyd Kaufman appears as Genericon. James Roday Rodriguez and Maggie Lawson cameo as news anchors.

Production

Development
In May 2007, Lakeshore Entertainment re-teamed with Mark Neveldine and Brian Taylor, the creators of Crank (2006), to produce a "high-concept futuristic thriller" called Game. Neveldine and Taylor wrote the script for Game and were slated to direct the film, while actor Gerard Butler was cast into the lead role.

Filming
Principal photography took place in Albuquerque, New Mexico for a 53-day shoot. Filming was at the Albuquerque Studios and on location around Albuquerque. Multistory sets were built on parking lots in downtown Albuquerque to depict buildings that were blown up in the film, and other sets were built on the back lots near the studios. The crew used special hand-held Red One digital cameras, which allowed the special effects team to begin work, normally done in post-production, after each day's shooting.

Title
In March 2009, the film's working title was changed from Game to Citizen Game. In May 2009, another name change was announced, the new name being Gamer.

Release

Box office
Gamer had an opening day gross of $3.3 million and ranked fourth at the box office. In total, the film earned $9.2 million in its opening weekend. Overall, the film grossed $21.5 million in the United States and Canada, and $20.7 million in other territories for worldwide cumulative of $42 million, against its $50 million budget.

Critical reception
Metacritic rated Gamer 27/100 based on 13 reviews, which it terms "generally unfavorable reviews". The film holds a 30% rating from 81 reviews on the review aggregator website Rotten Tomatoes and an average rating of 4.25/10. The site's critical consensus reads, "With all of the hyperkinetic action and none of the flair of Mark Neveldine and Brian Taylor's earlier work, Gamer has little replay value." Audiences surveyed by CinemaScore gave the film a grade "C" on scale of A to F.

Critic Joe Neumaier of The New York Daily News called it a "Xerox of a Xerox" and cited a number of films it supposedly takes elements from, including The Matrix and Rollerball. RVA Magazine wrote that Gamers plot was overly similar to The Condemned and commented that Gamer "hates its primary audience" and "tries to criticize the commercialization of violence, even though it itself is commercialized violence".

Cultural critic Steven Shaviro authored a 10,000 word defense and analysis of the film that he posted online, and eventually re-worked into the penultimate chapter of his book, Post-Cinematic Affect (Zer0 Books, 2010).

References

External links
 
 
 

2009 films
Cyberpunk films
2000s English-language films
2000s prison films
2009 science fiction action films
American science fiction action films
Films about death games
Films about telepresence
Films about video games
Films about virtual reality
Fiction about mind control
Films directed by Neveldine/Taylor
Films produced by Gary Lucchesi
Films scored by Geoff Zanelli
Films set in New York (state)
Films set in the 2030s
Films shot in New Mexico
American prison films
Lakeshore Entertainment films
Lionsgate films
2000s American films